Positive Tone Sdn. Bhd. was a Malaysian record label, established in 1993 by Jeff Siah and Kenny Tay.

The label's first release is Leonard Tan's debut album. After Paul Moss and Ahmad Izham Omar joined Positive Tone, the label become one of Malaysia's top recording companies. In 1998, Positive Tone was acquired by EMI Malaysia, after the 1997 Asian financial crisis. 

Some of the company's famous act includes Too Phat, Poetic Ammo, Reefa, VE, Ruffedge, Juliet The Orange, Nicestupidplayground and Innuendo. The label was closed in 2003, and all Positive Tone artists was absorbed into EMI Malaysia. As part of EMI's withdrawal from Southeast Asia market in 2008, EMI Malaysia was closed. The compilation album Best of Positive Tone was the last album to be released by EMI Malaysia.

See also
 List of record labels

References

External links
  (archived)

1993 establishments in Malaysia
2003 disestablishments in Malaysia
Malaysian record labels
Record labels established in 1993
Record labels disestablished in 2003
Defunct record labels
EMI
Defunct companies of Malaysia